The siege of the Castle of Saint George occurred from 8 November 1500 until 24 December 1500, when following a series of Venetian disasters at the hands of the Turks, the Spanish-Venetian army under Captain Gonzalo Fernández de Córdoba succeeded in capturing the Turkish stronghold of Cephalonia.

Cephalonia, one of the Ionian Islands off the western coast of Greece, had been in the hands of the Italian counts palatine of the Tocco family until 1479, when it was captured by the Ottoman Empire. With the exception of a brief period of Venetian control in 1482–83, the island remained in Ottoman hands until 1500.

The Second Ottoman–Venetian War broke out in 1499 with the Ottoman attack on the Venetian port of Lepanto on the Greek mainland, which surrendered on 24 August 1499. The war continued to go badly for Venice, as the Ottomans shifted their attention to the Morea and stormed Modon on 9 August 1500, followed by the surrender thereupon of the neighbouring forts Coron and Navarino. On 17 August 1500, however, the Spanish captain-general, Gonzalo Fernández de Córdoba, offered the forces at his disposal to the aid of Venice. Aided by the Spanish fleet, the newly appointed Venetian captain-general of the Sea, Benedetto Pesaro, landed on Cephalonia and after a siege took the island's capital, the Castle of St. George, on 24 December. The Spanish commander and his fleet returned to Sicily after that, but Pesaro went on to recover Santa Maura (Lefkada) as well in August 1502. When a peace treaty was concluded in Constantinople in December 1502, Cephalonia remained in Venetian hands, but Santa Maura was returned to Ottoman rule in 1503.

Notes

References
 Freely, John. The Ionian Islands: Corfu, Cephalonia, Ithaka and Beyond (2008) 
 

Conflicts in 1500
1500 in Europe
Saint George
1500 in the Ottoman Empire
Saint George Castle
Saint George Castle
Saint George Castle
Ottoman–Spanish conflicts
History of Cephalonia
Venetian rule in the Ionian Islands
Saint George